Néstor Lescovich (1944–2008) was an Argentine film director  and screenwriter, best known for his 1979 film Mis días con Verónica.

Lescovich was born October 14, 1944, in Buenos Aires. His 1970 short film Luis García won first prize at the Belgrade Film Festival in 1971. Ceremonias (1973) was shot without professional actors. Lescovich also taught at several film schools.

He died November 6, 2008.

Filmography
 Luis García (corto - 1970)
 Ceremonias (1971)  
 Mis días con Verónica (1979)  
 Sin opción (1994)  
 Corazón voyeur (2002)  
 Lisboa (2003)  
 Yo la recuerdo ahora (2007)

References

External links
 

1935 births
Living people
Argentine film directors
Argentine screenwriters
Male screenwriters
Argentine male writers
People from Buenos Aires